The  is a limited express train service in Japan operated by West Japan Railway Company (JR West), which runs from  to  and .

Stops

Trains stop at the following stations:

 -  -  -  - (Nishi-Akashi) - -  -  -  -  -  -  -  -  -  -  - -  -  -  - 

Only the Hamakaze No. 5 stops at Nishi-Akashi and Kakogawa.
Trains also stop at Kakogawa and Satsu during winter.

Rolling stock
New 130 km/h KiHa 189 series 3-car DMU sets were introduced on Hamakaze services from 7 November 2010.

Prior to November 2010, services were operated by 4-car KiHa 181 series DMU formations, lengthened to 5 or 7 cars in busy seasons.

Formations
As of 2021, trains are formed as shown below, with car 3 at the Osaka end.

Hamakaze 1 - 6

 All cars are standard class.
 All seats are reserved.
 All cars are no-smoking.
 Trains run as 6-car formations during busy periods.

History

The Hamakaze service was introduced by Japanese National Railways (JNR) on 15 March 1972.

All cars were made no-smoking from 1 June 2009.

References

External links

 JR West Hamakaze information 

Named passenger trains of Japan
West Japan Railway Company
Railway services introduced in 1972